Will Marshall is one of the founders of the New Democrat movement. Since its founding in 1989, he has been president of the Progressive Policy Institute, a think tank formerly affiliated with the Democratic Leadership Council (DLC).

He served on the board of the Committee for the Liberation of Iraq, an organization chaired by Joe Lieberman (I) and John McCain (R) designed to build support for the invasion of Iraq. Marshall also signed, at the outset of the war, a letter issued by the Project for the New American Century (PNAC) expressing support for the invasion. Marshall signed a similar letter sent to President Bush put out by the Social Democrats USA on Feb. 25, 2003, just before the invasion. The SDUSA letter urged Bush to commit to "maintaining substantial U.S. military forces in Iraq for as long as may be required to ensure a stable, representative regime is in place and functioning."

He writes frequently on political and public policy matters, especially the "Politics of Ideas" column in Blueprint, the DLC's magazine. Notably, he is one of the co-authors of Progressive Internationalism: A Democratic National Security Strategy.

Prior to the founding of PPI, Marshall was variously a speechwriter for Lieutenant Governor Dick Davis of Virginia, Governor Jim Hunt of North Carolina and Representative Gillis Long of Louisiana.

Marshall holds a B.A. in English and History from the University of Virginia.

External links

PPI's biography of Marshall
Rightweb's profile of Will Marshall
Progressive Policy Institute
Progressive Internationalism: A Democratic National Security Strategy
Matt Taibbi on Will Marshall vs. Michael Moore

Living people
Democratic Party (United States) politicians
University of Virginia alumni
Year of birth missing (living people)